Callipterinella tuberculata is a species of true bug belonging to the family Aphididae.

It is native to Europe.

References

Aphididae